The Calcutta trilogy may refer to either of the following two Bengali film trilogies:

Three films by Satyajit Ray:
 Pratidwandi  (The Adversary) (1970)
 Seemabaddha  (Company Limited) (1971)
 Jana Aranya  (The Middleman) (1976)

Three films by Mrinal Sen:
 Interview (1971)
 Calcutta 71 (1972)
 Padatik (The Guerilla Fighter) (1973)

Film series introduced in 1970
Films directed by Satyajit Ray
Indian film series
Films set in Kolkata
Bengali-language films
Trilogies